The canton of Authume is an administrative division of the Jura department, eastern France. It was created at the French canton reorganisation which came into effect in March 2015. Its seat is in Authume.

It consists of the following communes:
 
Amange
Archelange
Audelange
Authume
Auxange
Baverans
Biarne
Brans
Brevans
Champagney
Châtenois
Chevigny
Dammartin-Marpain
Éclans-Nenon
Falletans
Frasne-les-Meulières
Gendrey
Gredisans
Jouhe
Lavangeot
Lavans-lès-Dole
Louvatange
Malange
Menotey
Moissey
Montmirey-la-Ville
Montmirey-le-Château
Mutigney
Offlanges
Ougney
Pagney
Peintre
Pointre
Rainans
Rochefort-sur-Nenon
Romain
Romange
Rouffange
Saligney
Sermange
Serre-les-Moulières
Taxenne
Thervay
Vitreux
Vriange

References

Cantons of Jura (department)